Frank George Seyfang (June 17, 1890 - February 10, 1963) was a pioneer balloonist who developed the windsock balloon. He was a protégé of Thomas Scott Baldwin.

Patent
 Emergency Radio (1957)

References

1890 births
1963 deaths
American balloonists